Thomas Dwayne Dempsey (born May 8, 1967) is an American restaurateur and former Republican politician, previously serving in the Missouri Senate as President Pro Tempore. Dempsey is now a partner at the Gate Way Group, a multi-state government relations firm based in St. Louis.

Early life and education
He was born in St. Charles, Missouri, and received a B.S. degree from Rockhurst University in political science, where he was a member of Tau Kappa Epsilon -Kappa Nu chapter.

Career and politics

Dempsey is the former general manager of The Columns Banquet and Conference Center in St. Charles, Missouri. He is a member of St Cletus Catholic Church and the St. Charles Rotary Club, among others. A former member of the St. Charles City Council. In 2000, he was first elected to the Missouri House of Representatives, winning reelection in 2002, 2004 and 2006. He is the chairman of the Special Committee on Parliamentary Procedure, and also serves as the chair of both the Ethics and Rules committees.

Dempsey was elected to the Senate in a 2007 special election previously serving as Majority Floor Leader in the Missouri House of Representatives. In January 2009, he was elected to Majority Whip of the Senate. In January 2013, Dempsey was elected as President Pro Tem of the Missouri Senate.  Dempsey resigned from his Senate seat in August 2015. He is now a partner at the Gate Way Group, a St. Louis based lobbying firm.

Personal life
Dempsey was born to restaurant owner Ernest "Ernie" Dempsey and Peggy Pedrucci, along with younger sisters Anne and Mary. He lives in St. Charles, Missouri, with his wife Molly. They have three children.

References

Further reading
Official Manual, State of Missouri, 2005-2006. Jefferson City, MO: Secretary of State.

1967 births
American restaurateurs
Living people
Republican Party members of the Missouri House of Representatives
People from St. Charles, Missouri
Rockhurst University alumni
Catholics from Missouri